Mengistu (Amharic: መንግስቱ) is a male given name of Ethiopian origin that may refer to:

Mengistu Haile Mariam (born 1937), Ethiopian President and Chairman of the Derg
Mengistu Worku (1940–2010), Ethiopian football player and coach
Mengistu Neway (1919–1961), Ethiopian commander of the Imperial Bodyguard
Mengistu Lemma (1924–1988), Ethiopian playwright and poet.

Ethiopian given names
Amharic-language names